Fissurella coarctata, also known as the compressed keyhole limpet, is a species of marine gastropod in the family Fissurellidae, the keyhole limpets.

Description
The size of the shell attains 40 mm.

Distribution
This species occurs in the Atlantic Ocean off Cape Verde and Senegal.

References

External links
 

Fissurellidae
Molluscs of the Atlantic Ocean
Gastropods of Africa
Gastropods of Cape Verde
Invertebrates of West Africa
Gastropods described in 1832
Taxa named by Phillip Parker King